Juma Abdulla Al-Wahaibi commonly known as Juma Al-Wahaibi (born 2 March 1980) is an Omani footballer who plays for Al-Shabab Club.

International career
Juma was selected for the national team for the first time in 2002. He has made appearances in the 2006 FIFA World Cup qualification, the 2007 AFC Asian Cup qualification and the 2007 AFC Asian Cup.

References

External links

Juma Al-Wahaibi - GOAL.com
Juma Al-Wahaibi - GOALZZ.com
Juma Al-Wahaibi - GOALZZ.com
Juma Al-Wahaibi - GOALZZ.com
Juma Al-Wahaibi - KOOORA.com
Juma Al-Wahaibi - KOOORA.com
Juma Al-Wahaibi - KOOORA.com

1980 births
Living people
Omani footballers
Oman international footballers
Omani expatriate footballers
Association football midfielders
Ahli Sidab Club players
Muscat Club players
Al-Khor SC players
Al-Shabab SC (Seeb) players